Overton is a former civil parish, now in the parish of Malpas, in Cheshire West and Chester, England.  It contains five buildings that are recorded in the National Heritage List for England as designated listed buildings, all of which are at Grade II.  This grade is the lowest of the three gradings given to listed buildings and is applied to "buildings of national importance and special interest".  The parish is entirely rural, and all the listed buildings are domestic or related to houses.

References
Citations

Sources

Listed buildings in Cheshire West and Chester
Lists of listed buildings in Cheshire
Listed buildings in Overton, Cheshire